There are two main competing flavours of Syriac (Assyrian) nationalism:

Assyrianism
Aramaeanism

See also
Assyrian naming dispute
Phoenicianism